The Rothko Pavilion is a glass pavilion planned for construction in Portland, Oregon, connecting the Portland Art Museum's main building to the neighboring Mark Building. The $50 million project, announced in 2016 and named after Mark Rothko, required a redesign to incorporate a breezeway for accessibility purposes. By May 2017, the museum had raised approximately $27 million for the project, which will be the organization's largest expansion since 2005.

In May 2019, the project was approved by the city's Historic Landmarks Commission.

In January 2020, the museum received a donation of $10 million from philanthropist Arlene Schnitzer, to be used for the pavilion. The museum said that it hoped to begin construction in fall 2021, though it still had more funds to raise.

References

Portland Art Museum
Proposed buildings and structures in Oregon